Pontivy is a commune in the Morbihan department in Brittany in north-western France. It lies at the confluence of the river Blavet and the Canal de Nantes à Brest. Inhabitants of Pontivy are called Pontivyens in French.

Map

History
A monk called Ivy built a bridge nearby over the river Blavet in the 7th century, and the town is named after him ("pont-Ivi" being the Breton for "Ivy's bridge"). From November 9, 1804, the name was changed to Napoléonville after Napoléon Bonaparte, under whom it had around 3,000 inhabitants. After his downfall, it was renamed Pontivy again, then later Bourbonville, and Napoléonville again after Napoléon III came to power.

Population

Economy
This is a largely agricultural town.

Breton language
The municipality launched a linguistic plan through Ya d'ar brezhoneg on 8 August 2004. As part of that plan, all road signs in the town centre are bilingual.

In 2008, 11.34% of the children in the town attended the bilingual schools in primary education.

Sights
The castle of Rohan (with its moat) (late XVe).
The Notre-Dame-de-Joie basilica. [Basilica:
The Saint Joseph church. [Eglise St. Joseph:

Events
Every year the final round of Kan ar Bobl, a Breton music competition.

Twin towns
The town maintains twinning links with:
  Tavistock, United Kingdom since 1958
  Ouelessebougou, Mali since 1986
  Wesseling, Germany since 1972
  Napoléonville, United States since 1989

See also
Communes of the Morbihan department
Gaston-Auguste Schweitzer Sculptor of Pontivy war memorial

References

External links

Official website 

 Mayors of Morbihan Association 

Communes of Morbihan
Subprefectures in France